Francisco Aragón is a Latino poet, editor and writer.

Life
Born in San Francisco, California, Aragón's parents migrated from Nicaragua in the 1950s. is a graduate of Archbishop Riordan High School.  He studied at the University of California at Berkeley and New York University. He earned an MA from the University of California at Davis and an MFA from the University of Notre Dame.

Aragón directs Letras Latinas, the literary program of the Institute for Latino Studies at the University of Notre Dame.  He previously edited Momotombo Press.  He served on the board of directors of the Association of Writers & Writing Programs.

Publications
Aragón's books include Puerta del Sol (2005), and Glow of Our Sweat (2010).  He edited the groundbreaking anthology The Wind Shifts: New Latino Poetry (2007).

His poetry and translations have appeared in the anthologies Inventions of Farewell: A Book of Elegies (2001) and Mariposa: A Modern Anthology of Queer Latino Poetry (2008), the journals Beltway Poetry Quarterly, Crab Orchard Review, Chelsea, The Journal, the online journals Jacket, Electronic Poetry Review, and Poetry Daily.Awards
Aragón is the winner of an Academy of American Poets College Prize and the 2010 Outstanding Latino/a Cultural Award in Literary Arts or Publications from the American Association of Hispanics in Higher Education.  Aragón is a member of the prestigious Macondo Writers Workshop, the workshop founded by Sandra Cisneros.  Aragón was also a founding fellow of the CantoMundo writing conference.

 References 

External links

 Official website
 Aragón interview on Words on a Wire
 Interview with Sampsonia Way Review of Glow of Our Sweat at Lambda Literary Review
 Poems at Beltway Poetry Quarterly''

Living people
American book editors
American male poets
21st-century American poets
American people of Nicaraguan descent
American writers of Nicaraguan descent
English–Spanish translators
American gay writers
Hispanic and Latino American poets
LGBT Hispanic and Latino American people
American LGBT poets
New York University alumni
Poets from California
Poets from Indiana
University of California, Berkeley alumni
University of California, Davis alumni
University of Notre Dame alumni
University of Notre Dame faculty
Writers from San Francisco
Year of birth missing (living people)
LGBT people from California
21st-century American male writers
21st-century translators
Gay poets